Pleurobema johannis, the Alabama pigtoe, was a species of freshwater mussel, an aquatic bivalve mollusk in the family Unionidae, the river mussels.

This species was endemic to the United States. Its natural habitat was rivers.

References

Bivalves described in 1859
Extinct bivalves
johannis
Extinct invertebrates since 1500
Extinct animals of the United States
Natural history of Alabama
Taxonomy articles created by Polbot